Morinda coreia is a species of flowering plant in the coffee family, Rubiaceae. It was described by Francis Buchanan-Hamilton in 1822.

Distribution and habitat
Morinda coreia is native to southeast Asia, from Sri Lanka and India southeast to Java.

Gallery

References

coreia